The Supreme Court of the United States handed down nineteen per curiam opinions during its 2009 term, which began on October 5, 2009, and concluded October 3, 2010.

Because per curiam decisions are issued from the Court as an institution, these opinions all lack the attribution of authorship or joining votes to specific justices. All justices on the Court at the time the decision was handed down are assumed to have participated and concurred unless otherwise noted.

Court membership

Chief Justice: John Roberts

Associate Justices: John Paul Stevens, Antonin Scalia, Anthony Kennedy, Clarence Thomas, Ruth Bader Ginsburg, Stephen Breyer, Samuel Alito, Sonia Sotomayor

Corcoran v. Levenhagen

Bobby v. Van Hook

Further reading

Wong v. Belmontes

Further reading

Porter v. McCollum

Further reading

 .
 .
  (editorial).

Michigan v. Fisher

McDaniel v. Brown

Hollingsworth v. Perry

Presley v. Georgia

Further reading

 .

Wellons v. Hall

Wilkins v. Gaddy

Thaler v. Haynes

Kiyemba v. Obama

External links
 Merits brief for petitioners
 Merits brief for government respondents
 Kiyemba v. Obama at the Center for Constitutional Rights. Includes timeline of case and links to documents.

Robertson v. United States ex rel. Watson

Jefferson v. Upton

Sears v. Upton

See also 
 List of United States Supreme Court cases, volume 558
 List of United States Supreme Court cases, volume 559
 List of United States Supreme Court cases, volume 560
 List of United States Supreme Court cases, volume 561

Notes

References

 

United States Supreme Court per curiam opinions
Lists of 2009 term United States Supreme Court opinions
2009 per curiam